Ei Desh Tomar Amar is a 1959 Pakistani film starring Subhash Dutta and Sumita Devi opposite him. Ehtesham debuted his directing in this film. It was released on the Christmas Day of 1959. It also stars Azim, Anis and Rahman.

Singer Farida Yasmin debuted her playback singing career in this film through the song titled "Jani Na Furaye Jodi E Modhurati".

References

External links
 

1959 films
Bengali-language Pakistani films
Films scored by Khan Ataur Rahman
1950s Bengali-language films
Films directed by Ehtesham